

Spain
Cuba – Miguel Tacón, Governor of Cuba (1834–1838)
Puerto Rico – Miguel de la Torre, Governor of Puerto Rico (1823–1837)

Portugal
Angola – Military junta (1834–1836)

United Kingdom
 Malta Colony
Frederick Cavendish Ponsonby, Governor of Malta (1827–1835)
George Cardew, Acting Governor of Malta (1835–1836)
 New South Wales – Major-General Richard Bourke, Governor of New South Wales (1831–1837)
 Western Australia – Captain James Stirling, Governor of Western Australia (1828–1839)

Colonial governors
Colonial governors
1835